Claudio Bonivento (born 14 November 1950) is an Italian film producer, director, and screenwriter.

Life and career 
Born in Faggeto Lario, Como, Bonivento began his career as a theatrical organizer, an agent and a  record producer. In the late 1970s he started working as a film, television and stage producer. In 1997 he made his directorial debut with Other Men.

In 1989 Bonivento won the Nastro d'Argento for Best Producer for Marco Risi's Forever Mery. He also won three David di Donatello for Best Producer in 1991, 1993 and 2011, respectively for Boys on the Outside, The Escort and 20 sigarette.

Selected filmography 
Producer

 I fichissimi (1981)
 Viuuulentemente mia (1982)
 I'm Going to Live by Myself (1982)
 Eccezzziunale... veramente (1982)
 Time for Loving (1983)
 A Boy and a Girl (1984)
 Chewingum (1984)
 Love at First Sight (1985)
 Blues metropolitano (1985)
 Il ragazzo del Pony Express (1986) 
 Soldati - 365 all'alba (1987) 
 Sweets from a Stranger (1987)
 Sposi (1987)
 Delitti e profumi (1988)
 Appointment in Liverpool (1988)
 Days of Inspector Ambrosio (1988)
 Forever Mery (1989) 
 Boys on the Outside (1990) 
 Pummarò (1991)
 Una storia semplice (1991)
 The Inner Circle (1991) 
 Sabato italiano (1992)
 When We Were Repressed (1992)
 Ultra (1992)
 The Escort (1993)
 Policemen (1995)
 Who Killed Pasolini? (1995) 

Director
 Other Men (1997) 
 Le Giraffe (2000) 
 Il Pirata: Marco Pantani (2007)
 Era mio fratello (2007)
 Anita Garibaldi (2012)

References

External links 
 

1950 births
20th-century Italian people
Italian film directors
Italian screenwriters
People from the Province of Como
Living people
Italian film producers
Italian television directors
Italian television producers
David di Donatello winners
Nastro d'Argento winners
Italian male screenwriters